Middle Persian and Modern Persian form of the Avestan word yasna(lit. "[act of] worship”), which involves fire-ritual and is akin to yagna in Hinduism. The Hindi/Urdu word Jashn derives from this.

Jashn(जश्न) means Happiness or Celebration

Jashn may refer to:

 Jashn (2009 film), an Indian Hindi musical romance
 Jashn (album), a 1996 ghazal album by Indian artist Hariharan